This article details the geographical distribution of Russian-speakers. After the dissolution of the Soviet Union in 1991, the status of the Russian language often became a matter of controversy. Some Post-Soviet states adopted policies of derussification aimed at reversing former trends of Russification, while Belarus under Lukashenko and the Russian Federation under Putin reintroduced Russification policies in the 1990s and 2000s, respectively.

After the collapse of the Russian Empire in 1917, derussification occurred in the newly-independent Finland, Poland, Estonia, Latvia, Lithuania and the Kars Oblast, the last of which became part of Turkey.

The new Soviet Union initially implemented a policy of Korenizatsiya, which was aimed partly at the reversal of the tsarist Russification of the non-Russian areas of the country. Korenizatsiya (meaning "nativization" or "indigenization", literally "root-ification") was the early Soviet nationalities policy that was promoted mostly in the 1920s but with a continuing legacy in the later years. The primary policy consisted of promoting representatives of titular nations of Soviet republics and national minorities on lower levels of the administrative subdivision of the state, into local government, management, bureaucracy and nomenklatura in the corresponding national entities.

Joseph Stalin mostly reversed the implementation of Korenizatsiya in the 1930s not so much by changing the letter of the law but by reducing its practical effects and by introducing de facto Russification. The Soviet system heavily promoted Russian as the "language of interethnic communication".

Eventually, in 1990, Russian became legally the official all-Union language of the Soviet Union, with constituent republics having the right to declare their own official languages.

After the fall of the Soviet Union in 1991, about 25 million Russians (about a sixth of the former Soviet Russians) found themselves outside Russia and were about 10% of the population of the post-Soviet states other than Russia. Millions of them later became refugees from various interethnic conflicts.

Statistics

Native speakers

Subnational territories

Native and non-native speakers

Former Soviet Union

Other countries

Asia

Armenia

In Armenia, Russian has no official status but is recognized as a minority language under the Framework Convention for the Protection of National Minorities. According to estimates from Demoskop Weekly, in 2004 there were 15,000 native speakers of Russian in the country, and 1 million active speakers. 30% of the population was fluent in Russian in 2006, and 2% used it as the main language with family or friends or at work. Russian is spoken by 1.4% of the population according to a 2009 estimate from the World Factbook.

In 2010, in a significant pullback to derussification, Armenia voted to re-introduce Russian-medium schools.

Azerbaijan

In Azerbaijan, Russian has no official status but is a lingua franca of the country. According to estimates from Demoskop Weekly, in 2004 there were 250,000 native speakers of Russian in the country, and 2 million active speakers. 26% of the population was fluent in Russian in 2006, and 5% used it as the main language with family or friends or at work.

Research in 2005-2006 concluded that government officials did not consider Russian to be a threat to the strengthening role of the Azerbaijani language in independent Azerbaijan.  Rather, Russian continued to have value given the proximity of Russia and strong economic and political ties. However, it was seen as self-evident that to be successful, citizens needed to be proficient in Azerbaijani.

China
In the 1920s, the Chinese Communist Party and the Chinese Nationalist Party sent influential figures to study abroad in the Soviet Union, including Deng Xiaoping and Chiang Ching-kuo, who both were classmates and fluent in Russian. Now, Russian is only spoken by the small Russian communities in the northeastern Heilongjiang province and the northwestern Xinjiang province.

Israel

Russian is also spoken in Israel by at least 1,000,000 ethnic Jewish immigrants from the former Soviet Union, according to the 1999 census. The Israeli press and websites regularly publish material in Russian, and there are Russian newspapers, television stations, schools, and social media outlets based in the country.

Kazakhstan
In Kazakhstan, Russian is not a state language, but according to Article 7 of the Constitution of Kazakhstan, its usage enjoys equal status to that of the Kazakh language in state and local administration. According to estimates from Demoskop Weekly, in 2004 there were 4,200,000 native speakers of Russian in the country and 10 million active speakers. 63% of the population was fluent in Russian in 2006, and 46% used it as the main language with family, friends or at work. According to a 2001 estimate from the World Factbook, 95% of the population can speak Russian. Large Russian-speaking communities still exist in northern Kazakhstan, and ethnic Russians comprise 25.6% of Kazakhstan's population. The 2009 census reported that 10,309,500 people, or 84.8% of the population aged 15 and above, could read and write well in Russian and understand the spoken language.

Kyrgyzstan
In Kyrgyzstan, Russian is an official language per Article 5 of the Constitution of Kyrgyzstan. According to estimates from Demoskop Weekly, in 2004 there were 600,000 native speakers of Russian in the country, and 1.5 million active speakers. 38% of the population was fluent in Russian in 2006, and 22% used it as the main language with family or friends or at work.

The 2009 census states that 482,200 people speak Russian as a native language, including 419,000 ethnic Russians, and 63,200 from other ethnic groups, for a total of 8.99% of the population. Additionally, 1,854,700 residents of Kyrgyzstan aged 15 and above fluently speak Russian as a second language, 49.6% of the population in that age group.

Russian remains the dominant language of business and upper levels of government. Parliament sessions are only rarely conducted in Kyrgyz and mostly take place in Russian. In 2011, President Roza Otunbaeva controversially reopened the debate about Kyrgyz getting a more dominant position in the country.

Tajikistan
In Tajikistan, Russian is the language of interethnic communication under the Constitution of Tajikistan. According to estimates from Demoskop Weekly, in 2004 there were 90,000 native speakers of Russian in the country and 1 million active speakers. 28% of the population was fluent in Russian in 2006, and 7% used it as the main language with family or friends or at work. The World Factbook notes that Russian is widely used in government and business.

After independence, Tajik was declared the sole state language, and until 2009, Russian was designated the "language for interethnic communication". The 2009 law stated that all official papers and education in the country should be conducted only in the Tajik language. However, the law also stated that all minority ethnic groups in the country have the right to choose the language in which they want their children to be educated.

Turkmenistan
Russian lost its status as the official lingua franca of Turkmenistan in 1996. According to estimates from Demoskop Weekly, in 2004 there were 150,000 native speakers of Russian in the country and 100,000 active speakers. Russian is spoken by 12% of the population, according to an undated estimate from the World Factbook.

Russian television channels have mostly been shut down in Turkmenistan, and many Russian-language schools were closed down.

Uzbekistan
In Uzbekistan, Russian has no official status but is a lingua franca. According to estimates from Demoskop Weekly, in 2004 there were 1,200,000 native speakers of Russian in the country and 5 million active speakers. Russian is spoken by 14.2% of the population, according to an undated estimate from the World Factbook.

After the independence of Uzbekistan in 1991, Uzbek culture underwent the three trends of derussification, the creation of an Uzbek national identity, and westernization. The state has primarily promoted those trends through the educational system, which is particularly effective because nearly half the Uzbek population is of school age or younger.

Since the Uzbek language became official and privileged in hiring and firing, there has been a brain drain of ethnic Russians in Uzbekistan. The displacement of the Russian-speaking population from the industrial sphere, science and education has weakened those spheres. As a result of emigration, participation in Russian cultural centers like the State Academy Bolshoi Theatre in Uzbekistan has seriously declined.

In the capital, Tashkent, statues of the leaders of the Russian Revolution were taken down and replaced with local heroes like Timur, and urban street names in the Russian style were Uzbekified. In 1995, Uzbekistan ordered the Uzbek alphabet changed from a Russian-based Cyrillic script to a modified Latin alphabet, and in 1997, Uzbek became the sole language of state administration.

Rest of Asia
In 2005, Russian was the most widely taught foreign language in Mongolia, and is compulsory in Year 7 onward as a second foreign language in 2006.

Russian is also spoken as a second language by a small number of people in Afghanistan.

Oceania

Australia
Australian cities Melbourne and Sydney have Russian-speaking populations, most of which live in the southeast of Melbourne, particularly the suburbs of Carnegie and Caulfield. Two-thirds of them are actually Russian-speaking descendants of Germans, Greeks, Jews, Azerbaijanis, Armenians or Ukrainians, who either were repatriated after the Soviet Union collapsed or are just looking for temporary employment.

Europe

Belarus

In Belarus, Russian is co-official alongside Belarusian per the Constitution of Belarus. According to estimates from Demoskop Weekly, in 2004 there were 3,243,000 native speakers of Russian in the country and 8 million active speakers; 77% of the population was fluent in Russian in 2006, and 67% used it as the main language with family or friends or at work.

Initially, when Belarus became independent in 1991 and the Belarusian language became the only state language, some derussification started. However, after Alexander Lukashenko became president, a referendum held in 1995, which was considered fraudulent by the Organization for Security and Co-operation in Europe, included a question about the status of Russian. It was made a state language, along with Belarusian.

In most spheres, the Russian language is by far the dominant one. In fact, almost all government information and websites are in Russian only.

Bulgaria
Bulgaria has the largest proportion of Russian-speakers among European countries that were not part of the Soviet Union. According to a 2012 Eurobarometer survey, 19% of the population understands Russian well enough to follow the news, television, or radio.

Estonia

In Estonia, Russian is officially considered a foreign language. According to estimates from Demoskop Weekly, in 2004 there were 470,000 native speakers of Russian in the country, and 500,000 active speakers, 35% of the population was fluent in Russian in 2006, and 25% used it as the main language with family or friends or at work. Russian is spoken by 29.6% of the population, according to a 2011 estimate from the World Factbook.

Ethnic Russians are 25.5% of the country's current population and 58.6% of the native Estonian population is also able to speak Russian. In all, 67.8% of Estonia's population could speak Russian. The command of Russian, however, is rapidly decreasing among younger Estonians and is primarily being replaced by the command of English. For example, 53% of ethnic Estonians between 15 and 19 claimed to speak some Russian in 2000, but among the 10- to 14-year-old group, command of Russian had fallen to 19%, about one third the percentage of those who claim to command English in the same age group.

In 2007, Amnesty International harshly criticized what it termed Estonia's "harassment" of Russian-speakers. In 2010, the language inspectorate stepped up inspections at workplaces to ensure that state employees spoke Estonian at an acceptable level. That included inspections of teachers at Russian-medium schools. Amnesty International continues to criticize Estonian policies: "Non-Estonian speakers, mainly from the Russian-speaking minority, were denied employment due to official language requirements for various professions in the private sector and almost all professions in the public sector. Most did not have access to affordable language training that would enable them to qualify for employment."

The percentage of Russian speakers in Estonia is still declining, but not as fast as in the most of ex-Soviet countries. After overcoming the consequences of 2007 economic crisis, the tendency of emigration of Russian speakers has almost stopped, unlike in Latvia or in Lithuania.

Finland

Russian is spoken by 1.4% of the population of Finland, according to a 2014 estimate from the World Factbook. Russian is the third most-spoken native language in Finland and one of the fastest growing ones in terms of native speakers as well as learners as a foreign language.

Russian is becoming more prominent because of an increase in trade with and tourism to and from the Russia and other Russian-speaking countries and regions. There is a steadily-increasing demand for the knowledge of Russian in the workplace, which is also reflected in its growing presence in the Finnish education system, including higher education. In Eastern Finland, Russian has already begun to rival Swedish as the second most important foreign language.

Georgia
In Georgia, Russian has no official status but is recognized as a minority language under the Framework Convention for the Protection of National Minorities. According to estimates from Demoskop Weekly, in 2004 there were 130,000 native speakers of Russian in the country, and 1.7 million active speakers. 27% of the population was fluent in Russian in 2006, and 1% used it as the main language with family, friends or at work. Russian is the language of 9% of the population according to the World Factbook. Ethnologue cites Russian as the country's de facto working language.

Georgianization has been pursued with most official and private signs only in the Georgian language, with English being the favored foreign language. Exceptions are older signs remaining from Soviet times, which are generally bilingual Georgian and Russian. Private signs and advertising in the Samtskhe-Javakheti region, which has a majority Armenian population, are generally in Russian only or Georgian and Russian. In the Kvemo Kartlii borderline region, which has a majority ethnic Azerbaijani population, signs and advertising are often in Russian only, in Georgian and Azerbaijani, or Georgian and Russian. Derussification has not been pursued in the areas outside Georgian government control: Abkhazia and South Ossetia.

The Russian language is co-official in the breakaway republics of Abkhazia, and South Ossetia.

Germany
Germany has the highest Russian-speaking population outside the former Soviet Union, with approximately 3 million people. They are split into three groups, from largest to smallest: Russian-speaking ethnic Germans (Aussiedler), ethnic Russians, and Jews.

Latvia

In 1988, the Latvian Soviet Socialist Republic declared Latvian the sole official language.

Despite large Russian-speaking minorities in Latvia (26.9% ethnic Russians, 2011) Russian is officially considered a foreign language; 55% of the population being fluent in Russian in 2006, and 26% used it as the main language with family or friends or at work.

In March 2010, factsheets in Russian produced by the EU executive's offices in Latvia were withdrawn, provoking criticism from Plaid Cymru MEP and European Free Alliance group President Jill Evans, who called European Commission to continue to provide information in non-official EU languages and commented that "it's disappointing to hear that the EU is bowing to pressure to exclude Russian speakers in the Baltic in this way".

A constitutional referendum, held in February 2012, proposed amendments to the constitution of Latvia to make Russian the second state language of Latvia, but 821,722 (75%) of the voters voted against and 273,347 (25%) for. There has been criticism that about 290,000 of the 557,119 (2011) ethnic Russians in Latvia are non-citizens and do not have the right to vote.

Beginning in 2019, instruction in Russian will be gradually discontinued in private colleges and universities, as well general instruction in public high schools except for subjects related to culture and history of the Russian minority, such as Russian language and literature classes.

Lithuania
In the 1992 Constitution of Lithuania, Lithuanian was declared as the sole state language.

In Lithuania, Russian has no official or any other legal status, but the use of the language has some presence in certain areas. A large part of the population (63% as of 2011), especially the older generations, can speak Russian as a foreign language. Only 3% used it as the main language with family or friends or at work, though. English has replaced Russian as lingua franca in Lithuania and around 80% of young people speak English as the first foreign language. In contrast to the other two Baltic states, Lithuania has a relatively small Russian-speaking minority (5.0% as of 2008).

Unlike Latvia or Estonia, Lithuania has never implemented the practice of regarding some former Soviet citizens as non-citizens.

Moldova

In Moldova, Russian has a status similar to the other recognized minority languages; it was also considered to be the language of interethnic communication under a Soviet-era law.

According to estimates from Demoskop Weekly, in 2004 there were 450,000 native speakers of Russian in the country and 1.9 million active speakers. 50% of the population was fluent in Russian in 2006, and 19% used it as the main language with family or friends or at work. According to the 2014 census, Russian is the native language of 9.68% of Moldovans, and the language of first use for 14.49% of the population.

Russian has a co-official status alongside Romanian in the autonomies of Gagauzia and Transnistria.

Romania

According to the 2011 Romanian census, there are 23,487 Russian-speaking Lipovans practicizing the Lipovan Orthodox Old-Rite Church. They are concentrated in Dobruja, mainly in the Tulcea County but also in the Constanța County. Outside Dobruja, the Lipovans of Romania live mostly in the Suceava County and in the cities of
Iași, Brăila and Bucharest.

Russia
According to the census of 2010 in Russia, Russian skills were indicated by 138 million people (99.4% population), and according to the 2002 census, the number was 142.6 million people (99.2% population). Among urban residents, 101 million people (99.8%) had Russian language skills, and in rural areas, the number was 37 million people (98.7%). The number of native Russian-speakers in 2010 was 118.6 million (85.7%), a bit higher than the number of ethnic Russians (111 million, or 80.9%).

Russian is the official language of Russia but shares the official status at regional level with other languages in the numerous ethnic autonomies within Russia, such as Chuvashia, Bashkortostan, Tatarstan, and Yakutia, and 94% of school students in Russia receive their education primarily in Russian.

In Dagestan, Chechnya, and Ingushetia, derussification is understood not so much directly as the disappearance of Russian language and culture but rather by the exodus of Russian-speaking people themselves, which intensified after the First and the Second Chechen Wars and Islamization; by 2010, it had reached a critical point. The displacement of the Russian-speaking population from industry, science and education has weakened those spheres.

In the Republic of Karelia, it was announced in 2007 that the Karelian language would be used at national events, but Russian is still the only official language (Karelian is one of several "national" languages), and virtually all business and education is conducted in Russian. In 2010, less than 8% of the republic's population was ethnic Karelian.
 
Russification is reported to be continuing in Mari El.

Ukraine

In Ukraine, Russian is seen as a minority language under the 1996 Constitution of Ukraine. According to estimates from Demoskop Weekly, in 2004 there were 14,400,000 native speakers of Russian in the country and 29 million active speakers; 65% of the population was fluent in Russian in 2006, and 38% used it as the main language with family or friends or at work.

In 1990, Russian became legally the official all-Union language of the Soviet Union, with constituent republics having rights to declare their own official languages. In 1989, the Ukrainian SSR government adopted Ukrainian as its official language, which was affirmed after the fall of the Soviet Union as the only official state language of the newly-independent Ukraine. The educational system was transformed over the first decade of independence from a system that was overwhelmingly Russian to one in which over 75% of tuition was in Ukrainian. The government has also mandated a progressively increased role for Ukrainian in the media and commerce.

In 2012 poll by RATING, 50% of respondents consider Ukrainian their native language, 29% - Russian, 20% consider both Ukrainian and Russian their mother tongue, another 1% considers a different language their native language.). However, the transition lacked most of the controversies that surrounded the derussification in several of the other former Soviet Republics.

In some cases, the abrupt changing of the language of instruction in institutions of secondary and higher education led to charges of assimilation, which were raised mostly by Russian-speakers. In various elections, the adoption of Russian as an official language was an election promise by one of the main candidates (Leonid Kuchma in 1994, Viktor Yanukovych in 2004, and the Party of Regions in 2012). After the introduction of the 2012 legislation on languages in Ukraine, Russian was declared a "regional language" in several southern and eastern parts of Ukraine. On 28 February 2018, the Constitutional Court of Ukraine ruled that legislation to be unconstitutional.

Rest of Europe

In the 20th century, Russian was a mandatory language taught in the schools of the members of the old Warsaw Pact and in other communist countries that used to be Soviet satellites, including Poland, Bulgaria, the Czech Republic, Slovakia, Hungary, Albania, the former East Germany and Cuba. However, younger generations are usually not fluent in it because Russian is no longer mandatory in schools. According to the Eurobarometer 2005 survey, fluency in Russian remains fairly high, however, at (20–40%) in some countries, particularly those whose people speak a Slavic language and so have an edge in learning Russian (Poland, the Czech Republic, Slovakia, and Bulgaria).

Significant Russian-speaking groups also exist in other parts of Europe and have been fed by several waves of immigrants since the beginning of the 20th century, each with its own flavor of language. The United Kingdom, Spain, Portugal, France, Italy, Belgium, Greece, Norway, and Austria have significant Russian-speaking communities.

According to the 2011 census of Ireland, there were 21,639 people using Russian at home. However, only 13% were Russian nationals. 20% held Irish citizenship, while 27% and 14% were Latvian and Lithuanian citizens respectively.

There were 20,984 Russian-speakers in Cyprus according to the 2011 census of 2011 and accounted for 2.5% of the population.

Russian is spoken by 1.6% of the people of Hungary according to a 2011 estimate from the World Factbook.

Americas

The language was first introduced in North America when Russian explorers voyaged into Alaska and claimed it for Russia in the 1700s. Although most Russian colonists left after the United States bought the land in 1867, a handful stayed and have preserved the Russian language in the region although only a few elderly speakers of their unique dialect are left. In Nikolaevsk, Russian is more spoken than English. Sizable Russian-speaking communities also exist in North America, especially in large urban centers of the US and Canada, such as New York City, Philadelphia, Boston, Los Angeles, Nashville, San Francisco, Seattle, Spokane, Toronto, Calgary, Baltimore, Miami, Chicago, Denver and Cleveland. In a number of locations, they issue their own newspapers, and live in ethnic enclaves (especially the generation of immigrants who started arriving in the early 1960s). Only about 25% of them are ethnic Russians, however. Before the dissolution of the Soviet Union, the overwhelming majority of Russophones in Brighton Beach, Brooklyn in New York City were Russian-speaking Jews. Afterward, the influx from the countries of the former Soviet Union changed the statistics somewhat, with ethnic Russians and Ukrainians immigrating along with some more Russian Jews and Central Asians. According to the United States Census, in 2007 Russian was the primary language spoken in the homes of over 850,000 individuals living in the United States.

Russian was the most popular language in Cuba in the second half of the 20th century. Besides being taught at universities and schools, there were also educational programs on the radio and TV. It is now making a come-back in the country.

There is a small community of Russian Brazilians who have kept the use of the Russian language, mostly in the hinterland of the southern state of Paraná.

See also
 Russian world
 Russian diaspora

Notes

References

External links
  Uralic family home page
  What countries speak Russian
 Language Controversy in Kyrgyzstan - Institute for War and Peace Reporting, 23 November 2005
 Ukrainian language - the third official? - Ukrayinska Pravda, 28 November 2005

 
Russian